A list of films produced in Argentina in 1935:

1935
Films
Argentine